The 42nd All Japan Rugby Football Championship was held in 2005.

Knockout stages

2005

Final

See also 
Rugby union in Japan

All-Japan Rugby Football Championship
2004–05 in Japanese rugby union